Thomas Harrington may refer to:

 Thomas Harrington (died 1460), English knight
 Thomas Harrington (diver), British Olympic diver
 Thomas Harrington (FBI), Associate Deputy Director of the United States Federal Bureau of Investigation
 Thomas Harrington (footballer), English footballer
 Thomas Harrington & Sons,  a coachbuilder
 Tom Harrington (footballer) (1908–1988), Australian rules footballer
 Tom Harrington (journalist), Canadian radio and television journalist
 Thomas Harrington (baseball) (born 2001), American baseball player